Megistostegium perrieri is a plant in the family Malvaceae. It is endemic to Madagascar.

Description
Its large leaves are orbicular to round in shape. The flowers are pendant with an epicalyx that matures to a deep maroon colour. The pollen is yellow when fresh.

Distribution and habitat
Megistostegium perrieri is found only on the coastline of the Mahafaly Plateau of Toliara Province in southern Madagascar, including in the Special Reserve at Cape Sainte Marie. Its habitat is in rocky areas from sea level to about  elevation.

Conservation
Megistostegium perrieri has been assessed as endangered on the IUCN Red List. It is threatened by land conversion for agriculture, mining and forestry. It is also threatened by wildfires..

Uses
The leaves of M. perrieri are locally used to treat coughs. The branches are sometimes used for decorative purposes.

References

Hibisceae
Endemic flora of Madagascar
Plants described in 1915